McGarty is a surname. Notable people with the surname include:

Packy McGarty (1933–2021), Gaelic footballer
Shona McGarty (born 1991), English actress and singer

See also
Garty
McGarry
McGary